James McGeough (born April 13, 1963 in Regina, Saskatchewan) is a Canadian retired professional ice hockey player. He played 57 games in the National Hockey League with the Washington Capitals and Pittsburgh Penguins between 1981 and 1987. The rest of his career, which lasted from 1981 to 2004, was spent in various minor leagues. McGeough was selected by the Capitals in the 1981 NHL Entry Draft. His brother, Mick McGeough, was a referee in the NHL.

Career statistics

Regular season and playoffs

External links
 
 Profile at hockeydraftcentral.com

1963 births
Living people
Albany Choppers players
Baltimore Skipjacks players
Billings Bighorns players
Binghamton Whalers players
Bracknell Bees players
Canadian expatriate ice hockey players in England
Canadian expatriate ice hockey players in the United States
Canadian ice hockey centres
Connecticut Coasters players
Dallas Freeze players
EC KAC players
Hershey Bears players
Ice hockey people from Saskatchewan
Kalamazoo Wings (1974–2000) players
Lubbock Cotton Kings players
Muskegon Lumberjacks players
Nanaimo Islanders players
Oklahoma Coyotes players
Phoenix Roadrunners (IHL) players
Pittsburgh Penguins players
Regina Pats players
Reno Renegades players
Richmond Renegades players
Sacramento River Rats players
San Diego Gulls (IHL) players
Sportspeople from Regina, Saskatchewan
Springfield Indians players
St. Louis Vipers players
Washington Capitals draft picks
Washington Capitals players
Wichita Thunder players